Autumn is a 2008 Turkish drama film directed by Özcan Alper, filmed trilingually in Turkish, Georgian and Homshetsi Armenian. It was filmed in Hopa, Çamlıhemşin, and Kemalpaşa. It profiles Yusuf, who as a 22-year-old university student was jailed for rioting, after his release from prison.

Cast
Onur Saylak as Yusuf
Megi Kobaladze as Eka
Serkan Keskin as Mikail
Raife Yenigül as Gülefer
Nino Lejava as Maria
Sibel Öz as Asiye
Cihan Camkerte as Onur
Serhan Pirpir as Cihan
Yasar Güven as Kogus Yasar

Awards
2008: Won "Best Film" and "Jury Award" at the 15th Adana Altın Koza Film Festivali, Turkey
2008: Won NETPAC Award at the Avrasya International Film Festivali
2008: Won "C.I.C.A.E. Award" at Locarno International Film Festival
2008: Won "Silver Prometheus" at the Tbilisi International Film Festival
2009: Won "Best film" at the Ankara International Film Festival
2009: Won "Best director" at the Ankara International Film Festival
2009: Won "Best director" at the Sofia International Film Festival
2009: Won "FIPRESCI Prize" at the Yerevan International Film Festival
2009: Won "Jury Special Prize" for Best Film at the Yerevan International Film Festival
2009: Won "Best First Film" at the 2nd Yeşilçam Awards
2009: Nominated for "European Discovery of the Year" at the European Film Awards

References

External links
Nar Film Official website

Film page on Filmpot

2008 films
2008 drama films
Turkish drama films
2000s Turkish-language films
Films set in Turkey
Best Picture Golden Boll Award winners
2008 directorial debut films